The U.S. vs. John Lennon is a documentary film about Lennon's transformation from member of the Beatles to anti-war activist opposing the reelection of Richard Nixon as president in 1972. The film also details the attempts by the Nixon administration to deport Lennon from the US to end his anti-war and anti-Nixon campaigns. The film had its world premiere at the Venice Film Festival and its North American premiere at the Toronto International Film Festival.  It was released in New York City and Los Angeles, California on 15 September 2006, and had a nationwide release on 29 September. A soundtrack composed of John Lennon tracks was released by Capitol Records and EMI on 26 September 2006.

The film makes extensive use of archival footage of Lennon and Yoko Ono, and includes an interview conducted by anti-war reporter Gloria Emerson.

The U.K. release was on December 8, 2006, 26 years to the day after the death of John Lennon. The DVD was released on February 13, 2007 in the United States. The film made its cable television debut in the U.S. on August 18, 2007 on VH1 Classic.

Synopsis

The film explores the political activism that Lennon became strongly involved in with the Beatles, and after the band ended.

John Lennon is established as being a potential political threat to the American government, and therefore much of the film covers the theme of 'silencing' him and other popular figures that became involved in anti-war activism. Throughout the film the audience can see both sides of the situation: the audience sees the protests and events Lennon and Yoko Ono organised, such as the famous "Give Peace a Chance" rally and concepts such as bagism and bed peace.

We also see the increasing fear experienced by the US government and CIA. This build-up of paranoia and fear for control led to the eventual deportation notice sent to John Lennon's house, informing him that 'his temporary stay in the USA was now over'. The film debunks and exposes the somewhat bizarre behaviour of the CIA and police department over John Lennon and other contemporary figures' behaviour, referring also to different modern issues like drug abuse.

The film features a montage of various mediums. There are videos of performances of songs and interviews of Lennon at the time, recordings of Yoko Ono both present and from the late 1960s and 1970s, as well as a basic story structure of retelling the story of John Lennon's attempts to spread a message of peace around the United States and, on a wider scale, the entire Western world during the Vietnam War.

The DVD "Extras" contain a further 54 minutes of interview segments within ten topic sections, the highlight with Yoko Ono reading her letter written in 2000, to the Parole Board, whom at the time were considering the case of John Lennon's killer, Mark David Chapman.

Cast
John Lennon
Tariq Ali
Carl Bernstein
Noam Chomsky
Walter Cronkite
Mario Cuomo
Angela Davis
John Dean
David Fenton
Ron Kovic
G. Gordon Liddy
George McGovern
Elliot Mintz
Richard Nixon
Yoko Ono
Geraldo Rivera
Bobby Seale
Tom Smothers
Jon Wiener
Leon Wildes
Gore Vidal

Soundtrack

Reception

The US Verses John Lennon received mostly positive reviews from critics. The film holds a "Certified Fresh" 77% rating on Rotten Tomatoes based on ninety-seven reviews. The site's consensus states: "Though it glosses over anything negative about Lennon, this documentary offers a lot of fascinating archival footage, plus its political issues still have relevance for today."

Among the positive reviews was Roger Ebert's review, as he gave this film three stars out of four stating that he felt that the film was "remarkable" and "it was great to see a lot of this footage of Lennon-- playful, engaged, warm and spontaneous."

See also
 Jon Wiener—historian who waged and won a 25-year battle to prompt FBI to release files on Lennon
“John Lennon is Still Bugging the White House.”  Los Angeles Times, Sept. 10, 2006, M6.
"Uncovering The 'Truth' Behind Lennon's FBI Files." NPR.org, Oct. 8, 2010
"While Nixon campaigned, the FBI watched Lennon."  New York Times, Sept. 21, 2006
"After 25 Years, FBI Finally Releases Last 10 Documents in John Lennon FBI File." American Civil Liberties Union, Dec. 20, 2006

References

External links
 
 
 

John Lennon
2006 films
2006 documentary films
American documentary films
Anti-war films about the Vietnam War
Documentary films about American politics
Documentary films about the Beatles
Films about activists
Films about freedom of expression
Films about John Lennon
Lionsgate films
2000s English-language films
2000s American films